Hi, Fidelity is a 2011 Hong Kong dramatic film written and directed by Calvin Poon. The film stars Pat Ha, Michelle Ye, Carrie Ng and William Chan.

Cast
 Pat Ha
 Michelle Ye
 Carrie Ng
 William Chan
 George Lam
 Chapman To
 Lawrence Cheng
 Candice Yu

Awards and nominations

31st Hong Kong Film Awards
Won – Best Original Song 
Nominated – Best New Director (Calvin Poon)

Release
The film was released in Hong Kong on 24 March 2011.

References

External links
 
 

2011 films
Hong Kong drama films
2010s Cantonese-language films
2010s Hong Kong films